Alfred Music is an American music publishing company. Founded in New York in 1922, it is headquartered in Van Nuys, California, with additional branches in Miami, New York, Germany, Singapore, and the United Kingdom.

History 
In New York City's Tin Pan Alley in 1922, Sam Manus, a violinist and importer of mood music for silent films, started a music publishing company and named it Manus Music. The company published primarily popular sheet music. In 1930, Sam acquired the music publisher, Alfred & Company, founded by Alfred Haase. Sam decided to combine the names and shortened it to Alfred Music, which the company is still known as today. Sam's son, Morty (né Morton Manus; 1926–2016), clarinetist and pianist, began working for Alfred Music in the late 1940s and met his wife Iris at the company when the bookkeeper, Rose Kopelman, brought her daughter to work one day. Inspired by the need for quality music educational products. Morty, a clarinetist and pianist, oversaw the development of an instructional series for accordion, followed by books for guitar, piano, and recorder. Alfred Music was now more than just a sheet music publisher; the company was taking its first steps to becoming the leader in music education. In 1975, the firm moved to larger offices in Los Angeles. In 1980, with growing sales, the company went international.

In 2002, the company partnered with Daisy Rock Girl Guitars, and in 2005 it acquired Warner Bros. Publications (including the Warner Bros. subsidiary company Belwin-Mills) from Warner Music Group.

In April 2016, Alfred Music joined Peaksware Holdings LLC, parent company of MakeMusic. Gear Fisher became CEO, and Ron Manus moved from CEO to Business Development Manager.

Product offerings 
Alfred's portfolio of music teaching products include:
 Sound Innovations
 SI Online: Access streaming video MasterClasses and audio accompaniments for SI Strings and SI Band Books 1 & 2, and Sound Percussion.
 Sound Innovations for String Orchestra: emphasizes playing with a characteristic sound.
 Ensemble Development for Concert Band: provides exercises to help students develop concepts needed to build the foundational qualities of concert band performance.
 Sound Percussion: four books plus a Teacher's Score for snare drum / bass drum, mallet percussion, timpani, and accessory instruments.
 Accent on Achievement course: a 3-book band-music course written by John O'Reilly and Mark Williams.
 Premier Piano course: includes a lesson book, theory books, performance books, technique books, and supplementary books.
 Behind the Player: a series of DVDs consisting of conversations with, and song instruction from, hard rock guitarists.

References

External links 
Alfred acquired by Peaksware Holdings, LLC  Alfred Music, an educational music publisher, has announced that it is joining the Peaksware Holdings, LLC portfolio of companies
Alfred Music joins Peaksware, parent company of MakeMusic
Alfred Publishing
Morton and Iris Manus NAMM Oral History Program (2003)
Ron Manus Interview NAMM Oral History Program (2014) 
Steven Raft Interview NAMM Oral History Program (2014)

Music publishing companies of the United States
Sheet music publishing companies
Publishing companies based in California
Companies based in Los Angeles
Van Nuys, Los Angeles
Publishing companies established in 1922
1922 establishments in New York City
Behind the Player